Kennedy–Lunsford Farm is a historic home, farm, and national historic district located near Lexington, Rockbridge County, Virginia. The district encompasses six contributing buildings.  They are the main house (c. 1775), plus a large bank barn, a corn crib / machinery shed, a spring house, a chicken coop and a syrup house, all dating from the early-20th century.  The main house is a two-story, three-bay, vernacular Georgian style stone dwelling with a gable roof and interior end chimneys.  It has a single bay, gable roofed front porch and two-story rear frame ell.

It was listed on the National Register of Historic Places in 1996.

References

Farms on the National Register of Historic Places in Virginia
Historic districts on the National Register of Historic Places in Virginia
Georgian architecture in Virginia
Houses completed in 1775
Houses in Rockbridge County, Virginia
National Register of Historic Places in Rockbridge County, Virginia
1775 establishments in Virginia